Mexico–North Korea relations are the current and historical relations between Mexico and North Korea. In 2017, there were 366 North Koreans residing in Mexico.

History
Mexico and North Korea established diplomatic relations on 4 September 1980; 27 years after the end of the Korean War. In 1993, North Korea opened an embassy in Mexico City. Initial diplomatic relations between both nations were cordial. In 1999, Mexico donated to the Korean Peninsula Energy Development Organization and North Korea has collaborated in projects throughout Mexico, particularly in the Mexican states of Durango, Oaxaca and Puebla.

In 2003, relations between both nations came to a low when North Korea withdrew from the Treaty on the Non-Proliferation of Nuclear Weapons. Since then, Mexico has repeatedly condemned all missile launches from North Korea. In June 2009, as a non-permanent member of the United Nations Security Council, Mexico voted in favor of United Nations Security Council Resolution 1874 which imposed further economic and commercial sanctions on North Korea and encouraged UN member states to search North Korean cargo ships. In July 2014, a North Korean merchant ship called the Mu Du Bong ran aground and damaged nearly an acre of coral reefs near the Mexican state of Veracruz. Mexico detained the ship after discovering that it belongs to a blacklisted shipping firm. The merchant ship was never released back to North Korea and in 2016 Mexico began scrapping the ship and released the crew members back to their home country.

Throughout 2017, Mexico has condemned all missile launches from North Korea.
On 7 September 2017, the Mexican Ministry of Foreign Affairs  declared persona non grata the Ambassador of North Korea in Mexico, Kim Hyong-gil and expelled him from the country within 72 hours. This decision followed the sixth nuclear test carried out by Pyongyang on September 3. In December 2018, Kim Yong-nam, President of the Presidium of the Supreme People's Assembly of North Korea arrived in Mexico City to attend the inauguration of President Andrés Manuel López Obrador.

On 12 June 2018, through a statement from the Mexican Ministry of Foreign Affairs, the Mexican government considered the meeting held between the President of the United States, Donald Trump and the North Korean Leader, Kim Jong-un to be of great importance for peace between the two nations.

Bilateral Agreements
Since establishing diplomatic relations in 1980, Mexico and North Korea have signed several bilateral agreements, such as an Agreement on the Avoidance of Double Taxation; Customs Agreement; Agreement on the prohibition of certain import and export products; Agreement on Health; Agreement on Education and Cultural Cooperation and a Treaty on the prohibition of testing nuclear weapons.

Trade
Mexico is North Korea's most important trading partner in Latin America with Mexico purchasing 1% of North Korea's total exports in 2015. That same year, Mexico sold US$45 million worth of oil to North Korea and at the same time, Mexico purchased US$13.8 million worth of products from North Korea, mostly computer parts. In 2017, total trade between both nations amounted to US$6.5 million.

Diplomatic missions

 Mexico is accredited to North Korea from its embassy in Seoul, South Korea.
 North Korea has an embassy in Mexico City.

See also
 Korean immigration to Mexico

References

 
North Korea
Bilateral relations of North Korea